Jacob Hollister (born November 18, 1993) is an American football tight end who is a free agent. He played college football at Wyoming. He has also played for the New England Patriots and Seattle Seahawks.

Early years
Born and raised in Bend, Oregon, Hollister graduated from its Mountain View High School in 2012 and was a three-sport letterman in football, basketball, and baseball.  As a senior quarterback, he was the state's Class 5A player of the year after leading the Cougars to the state title, and originally signed to play college football at the University of Nevada in Reno.

College career
Hollister redshirted for the Wolf Pack as a true freshman in 2012, then transferred to Arizona Western College, a community college in Yuma, where he switched positions to tight end. Hollister then played three seasons (2014–16) under new head coach Craig Bohl at the University of Wyoming in Laramie in the Mountain West Conference.  He was a team captain and first-team all-conference as a senior, when the much-improved Cowboys played in the conference championship game and Poinsettia Bowl.

Collegiate statistics

Professional career

New England Patriots
Not selected in the 2017 NFL Draft, Hollister was soon signed by the New England Patriots on April 30 to a three-year, $1.67 million contract that included $90,000 guaranteed and a signing bonus of $10,000. The Patriots also signed his twin brother Cody as an undrafted free agent; they became the only active pair of twins on the same team in 2017 and the third set of twins to currently play in the NFL.

In Week 1 of the 2017 preseason, Hollister caught seven passes for 116 yards against the Jacksonville Jaguars. Hollister put together a solid preseason performance while competing with James O'Shaughnessy for the Patriots possible third tight end spot behind veterans Rob Gronkowski and Dwayne Allen. Hollister ultimately won the spot as an undrafted rookie, and made his NFL debut in Week 2 against the New Orleans Saints, recording his first career catch, which went for seven yards. Hollister made it to Super Bowl LII, but the Patriots lost 41–33 to the Philadelphia Eagles.

Hollister entered the 2018 season as the third tight end on the depth chart, behind Gronkowski and Allen. He was limited to just eight games while dealing with hamstring and chest injuries, and was placed on injured reserve on January 8, 2019, prior to the Patriots' postseason. They reached Super Bowl LIII in February in Atlanta and defeated the Los Angeles Rams 13–3.

Seattle Seahawks
On April 29, 2019, the Patriots traded Hollister to the Seattle Seahawks for a seventh-round pick in the 2020 draft. He was waived on August 31, 2019, then signed to the practice squad the next day. Six weeks later, he was promoted to the active roster on October 12. On November 3, he caught a 10-yard walkoff touchdown pass against the Tampa Bay Buccaneers in overtime to give the Seahawks the win, 40–34. Earlier in the same game, Hollister scored the first touchdown of his NFL career, a one-yard reception late in the first half, after drawing a pass interference penalty in the end zone. In Week 10 against the San Francisco 49ers, Hollister caught 8 passes for 62 yards and a touchdown in the 27–24 overtime win.  Overall, in the 2019 season, Hollister finished with 41 receptions for 349 receiving yards and three receiving touchdowns.

On March 16, 2020, the Seahawks placed a second-round restricted free agent tender on Hollister. He signed the one-year contract on April 21, 2020.

Buffalo Bills
On March 19, 2021, Hollister signed a contract with the Buffalo Bills for one year, reuniting him with his quarterback at Wyoming, Josh Allen.

Hollister was released by the Bills on August 31, 2021.

Jacksonville Jaguars
On September 3, 2021, Hollister signed with the Jacksonville Jaguars.

Las Vegas Raiders
Hollister signed with the Las Vegas Raiders on March 22, 2022. He was placed on injured reserve on August 30, 2022 and then, on September 2, 2022, he was released by the Raiders.

Minnesota Vikings
On September 27, 2022, Hollister signed with the Minnesota Vikings practice squad.

Las Vegas Raiders (second stint) 
On November 11, 2022, Hollister was signed by the Las Vegas Raiders off the Vikings practice squad. He was released on December 17, 2022.

Seattle Seahawks (second stint) 
On December 28, 2022, Hollister was signed to the Seattle Seahawks practice squad.   His practice squad contract with the team expired after the season on January 14, 2023.

Personal life
Hollister is the twin brother of Cody Hollister, who is a wide receiver for the Tennessee Titans in the NFL.

References

External links
 
Seattle Seahawks bio
Wyoming Cowboys bio

1993 births
Living people
American football tight ends
Players of American football from Oregon
Sportspeople from Bend, Oregon
Wyoming Cowboys football players
New England Patriots players
Seattle Seahawks players
Buffalo Bills players
Jacksonville Jaguars players
Las Vegas Raiders players
Minnesota Vikings players
Twin sportspeople
American twins